Lene Hansen (born 1964) is a Danish former cricketer. She played ten Women's One Day International matches for the Denmark women's national cricket team between 1989 and 1991.

References

External links
 

1964 births
Living people
Danish women cricketers
Denmark women One Day International cricketers
Place of birth missing (living people)